Gabriela Knaul  is a Brazilian lawyer. She is a judge who was the UN Special Rapporteur on the Independence of Judges and Lawyers from 2009 until 2015.

References

United Nations special rapporteurs
Brazilian women lawyers
Living people
Year of birth missing (living people)